Ayub El Harrak Rouas (born 26 August 1994), simply known as Ayub, is a Moroccan footballer who plays for CD Guijuelo as a central midfielder.

Club career
Born in Barcelona, Catalonia, Ayub graduated from CE Mataró's youth setup, and made his senior debuts in the 2012–13 campaign, in the regional leagues. On 19 July 2013 he signed a two-year deal with Hungarian Nemzeti Bajnokság I side MTK Budapest FC.

Ayub played his first match as a professional on 9 August, coming on as a late substitute in a 0–1 home loss against Szombathelyi Haladás. He appeared in further three matches during his first and only season at the club, totalling 136 minutes of action.

On 21 July 2014 Ayub returned to Spain, joining Segunda División B side Real Valladolid B. On 13 July of the following year he moved to Girona FC, being immediately loaned to Marbella FC also in the third tier.

International career
On 10 December 2014, Ayub was called to the Morocco U-23 national team.

Career statistics

References

External links
HLSZ profile 

1994 births
Living people
Footballers from Barcelona
Spanish sportspeople of Moroccan descent
Spanish footballers
Moroccan footballers
Association football midfielders
Segunda División B players
Real Valladolid Promesas players
Girona FC players
CD Guijuelo footballers
MTK Budapest FC players
Nemzeti Bajnokság I players
Spanish expatriate footballers
Expatriate footballers in Hungary
Spanish expatriate sportspeople in Hungary
CE Mataró players